Bryan O'Sullivan (born 24 January 1988 in Kilmallock, County Limerick) is an Irish sportsperson.  He plays hurling with his local club Kilmallock and has been a member of the Limerick senior inter-county team since 2009.  O'Sullivan was captain of the Limerick senior hurling team for 2010.

References

 

1988 births
Living people
Kilmallock hurlers
UCC hurlers
Limerick inter-county hurlers